Shawn D. Wilson is an American politician and transportation official who served as the secretary of the Louisiana Department of Transportation and Development from 2016 to 2023.

Early life and career 
Wilson is from New Orleans. He intended to pursue nursing but changed his path after the death of his father. In 1993, Wilson completed a bachelor's degree in urban and regional planning from the University of Louisiana at Lafayette. He was president of the student government association and was the student member on the University of Louisiana System board. Wilson earned a master's degree and Ph.D. in public administration from the Southern University. His 2015 dissertation was titled, A comparative study of transportation decision making by state and locally elected officials in Louisiana. James S. Larson was Wilson's doctoral advisor.

Wilson was executive director of the Louisiana Serve Commission and served as the deputy legislative director for governor Kathleen Blanco. In 2005, Wilson joined the Louisiana Department of Transportation and Development as a confidential assistant to secretary Johnny Bradberry. In 2008, Wilson was a candidate for Lafayette Parish Council. He lost in a runoff. Wilson served as chief of staff to transportation secretary William Anker and Sherri LeBas. Wilson was appointed secretary by governor John Bel Edwards, beginning his term on January 11, 2016. In 2021, Wilson was elected president of the American Association of State Highway and Transportation Officials. He is the first African-American to serve in the role.

2023 Louisiana gubernatorial election 
In December 2022, Wilson established an exploratory committee for the 2023 Louisiana gubernatorial election. On February 15, 2023, Wilson announced that he would be resigning as secretary effective March 4, 2023, which was taken as confirmation that he would run for governor.

On March 6, 2023, Wilson officially launched his campaign for Governor of Louisiana.

Personal life 
Wilson and his wife, Rocki, live in Lafayette, Louisiana. They have two children. He is a Progressive Baptist.

References 

21st-century African-American politicians
21st-century American politicians
21st-century Baptists
African-American people in Louisiana politics
American transportation businesspeople
Baptists from Louisiana
Living people
Louisiana Democrats
Place of birth missing (living people)
Politicians from Lafayette, Louisiana
Politicians from New Orleans
Southern University alumni
University of Louisiana at Lafayette alumni
Year of birth missing (living people)